Pangkor Laut Island is a small island southwest of Pangkor Island, Perak, Malaysia.

History
During World War II, the island was where Freddie Spencer Chapman made his submarine getaway during the Japanese occupation of Malaya.
Luciano Pavarotti visited the island in 1994 and he declared the island a paradise. In 2002 Pavarotti officiated the opening of Spa Village, a spa facility attached to the Pangkor Laut Resort, with the unveiling of a plaque commemorating the event .

References

Islands of Perak
Manjung District